Henry Mayo Bateman (15 February 1887 – 11 February 1970, Mgarr, Malta) was a British humorous artist and cartoonist.

H. M. Bateman was noted for his "The Man Who..." series of cartoons, featuring comically exaggerated reactions to minor and usually upper-class social gaffes, such as "The Man Who Lit His Cigar Before the Royal Toast", "The Man Who Threw a Snowball at St. Moritz" and "The Boy Who Breathed on the Glass at the British Museum." which appeared in the satirical magazine Punch.

Early life

Henry Bateman was born in the small village of Sutton Forest in New South Wales, Australia. His parents were Henry Charles Bateman and Rose Mayo. His father had left England for Australia in 1878, at the age of 21, to seek his fortune, then returned to England briefly in 1885 before going back with an English wife. Soon after Henry was born, his strong-willed mother insisted that they return to London 'and civilisation'. He had one sister, Phyllis, three years younger.

Bateman was always drawing from an early age, consistently producing funny drawings that told stories. He was inspired by comics, had a keen critical eye, and was enthusiastically drawing at every available moment. At the age of 14, he had already decided that he would draw for publication. In 1901, the cartoonist Phil May, in response to a letter from Rose, showed interest in his drawings, and that year he was inspired by an exhibition of black-and-white art at the Victoria and Albert Museum. His father had initially decided that his son should follow him into business, but eventually, after many arguments between him and Rose, his father financed his study at the Westminster School of Art which he commenced at the age of 16. He did well but was bored by the lifeless "life" classes and after qualifying at Westminster transferred his study to the New Cross Art School. He also did some practical work at the studio of Charles van Havenmaet.

Career
Bateman's first solo exhibition in 1901 was at the Brook Street Gallery, Mayfair, in central London. His first contract was in 1904, for ten drawings and two illustrations in a fourpenny monthly magazine called The Royal. At the age of 17, his style was already that of a mature artist. He then progressed to a contract with The Tatler and many other magazines besides, including the Illustrated Sporting News and Dramatic News, Pearson's Weekly and Punch. Bateman greatly influenced the style of American cartoonist Harvey Kurtzman.  Bateman was selected by Percy Bradshaw for inclusion in his 1918 The Art of the Illustrator which presented a portfolio for each of twenty illustrators. His work was also part of the painting event in the art competition at the 1928 Summer Olympics.

Personal life
Bateman married Brenda Collison Wier and they had two children, Diana and Monica, both of whom became artists. They lived at Curridge, just north of Newbury, Berkshire. In later life, Bateman carried on an increasingly acrimonious battle with the Inland Revenue. His final years were spent on the island of Gozo, Malta. A centenary celebration of his work was exhibited at the Royal Festival Hall on London's South Bank in 1987. An English Heritage blue plaque, unveiled in 1997, commemorates Bateman at 40 Nightingale Lane in Clapham south London.

Publications
 Bateman, H. M., intr. A. E. Johnson. Burlesques. London: Duckworth, 1916. 
 Bateman, H. M. A Book of Drawings. London: Methuen, 1921. 
 Bateman, H. M. Colonels. London: Methuen, 1925.

Notes

References

Further reading
 Anderson, Anthony, The Man who was H. M. Bateman, Webb & Bower (Exeter, England, 1982) 
 Bradshaw, Percy V., H.M. Bateman and His Work, (London: Issued by the Press Art School, 1919)

External links

 H. M. Bateman: the website
 
 
 Bateman's Punch Illustrations in HeidICON
 Searchabe Archive

1887 births
1970 deaths
People from Chieveley
People educated at Glenalmond College
Alumni of the Westminster School of Art
Alumni of Goldsmiths, University of London
British cartoonists
Punch (magazine) cartoonists
Olympic competitors in art competitions